The Loudias or Lydias (Λυδίας), popularly called Mavroneri (Μαυρονέρι, "Blackwater", from its Ottoman Turkish name Kara Asmak قره آصماق) is a river in Central Macedonia that flows through the regional units of Pella and Thessaloniki draining into the Thermaic Gulf through the Axios Delta National Park.

Changes in river flow
In the past water from the Voras, Vermio and Paiko mountains, flowed into Giannitsa Lake and from there flowed to the Thermaic Gulf. The Loudias now collects water that comes mainly from Mount Paiko and the main source is close to Aravissos. A section of the river has been converted into an artificial channel (Channel 66-Moglenitsas), thus enabling the draining of Lake Giannitsa and its marshlands. Throughout the length of about 60 km, the region is fertile. At the city of Giannitsa there is a rowing centre. In 1912, during the First Balkan War, this area became the site of the Battle of Giannitsa.

References

External links

Landforms of Pella (regional unit)
Rivers of Greece
Landforms of Central Macedonia
Landforms of Thessaloniki (regional unit)
Drainage basins of the Aegean Sea